University of Judicial Sciences and Administrative Services, also known as University of Judicial Sciences, is an Iranian university     established in 1979, pursuant to Article 35 of the Rules of Justice Act, to meet justice needs in the areas of legal, judicial and administrative services.

Most of the judges in Iran are graduates of the University of Judicial Sciences. In addition, a significant number of attorneys in law enforcement, judiciary and administrative services are graduates of this university.

The president of the university is Dr.farid mohseni

References

External links
 

Educational institutions established in 1979
Jud
1979 establishments in Iran